4-Methylphenmetrazine (mephenmetrazine, 4-MPM, PAL-747) is a recreational designer drug with stimulant effects. It is a substituted phenylmorpholine derivative, closely related to better known drugs such as phenmetrazine and 3-fluorophenmetrazine. It was first identified in Slovenia in 2015, and has been shown to act as a monoamine releaser with some preference for serotonin release.

See also 
 4,4'-DMAR
 4-Methylamphetamine
 4-Methylmethylphenidate
 G-130
 Mephedrone
 RTI-32
 Phendimetrazine
 PDM-35

References 

Substituted amphetamines
Phenylmorpholines
Designer drugs